Angela Baraldi is an Italian actress and rock singer. She is best known for playing the lead role in the Gabriele Salvatores film and mini-series Quo Vadis, Baby?, as well as her role in the Golden Globe 1996 "Best Foreign Language"-nominated film Like Two Crocodiles.

Discography 
 1990 – Viva
 1993 – Mi vuoi bene o no?
 1996 – Baraldi lubrificanti
 2001 – Rosasporco
 2003 – Angela Baraldi

References

External links 

1964 births
Living people
Italian women singers
Italian film actresses
Italian rock singers
Actors from Bologna
20th-century Italian actresses
Musicians from Bologna